The Dickinson Post Office in Dickinson, North Dakota, is a post office building that was built in 1916.  It was expanded to the east in 1965–66. It was listed on the National Register of Historic Places in 1989 as U.S. Post Office-Dickinson.

It is built to be fireproof, with hollow tile walls which are faced in gray pressed Hebron brick, laid in American bond.  Ohio sandstone is used for trim, and polished granite is used for the front steps and the grade course.

References

Government buildings completed in 1916
Post office buildings on the National Register of Historic Places in North Dakota
Renaissance Revival architecture in North Dakota
National Register of Historic Places in Stark County, North Dakota
1916 establishments in North Dakota
Post Office